Jyd Goolie (born 11 May 1997) is a Trinidadian cricketer. He made his first-class debut for Trinidad and Tobago in the 2016–17 Regional Four Day Competition on 18 November 2016. Prior to his first-class debut, he was named in the West Indies squad for the 2016 Under-19 Cricket World Cup. In March 2020, in round eight of the 2019–20 West Indies Championship, Goolie scored his maiden century in first-class cricket.

References

External links
 

1997 births
Living people
Trinidad and Tobago cricketers
Place of birth missing (living people)